Diego Sebastián Vicente Pereyra (born July 19, 1998)  is a Uruguayan professional footballer who plays as a central midfielder for Danubio in the Uruguayan Segunda División.

Club career
Vicente started his career playing with River Plate. He made his professional debut during the 2015/16 season.

References

1998 births
Living people
Uruguayan footballers
Club Atlético River Plate (Montevideo) players
Association football midfielders